Panagiotis Kefalas was a Greek fighter of the Greek Revolution of 1821.

Biography 
He hailed from Dirrachi in the Androusa province, but was unrelated to the Kefalas magnate family. He took part in several battles of the Greek War of Independence, from the capture of Kalamata and Karytaina to the Battle of Valtetsi and the Siege of Tripolitsa, where he commanded a Tsakonian detachment with distinction. He also fought against Mahmud Dramali Pasha in 1822, and in Continental Greece. He fell at the Battle of Maniaki in 1825.

Sources
 

19th-century Greek people
1825 deaths
Greek people of the Greek War of Independence
Greek military personnel killed in action
People from Arcadia, Peloponnese